JAM Creative Productions, Inc., is an American company that produces radio jingles, promo music for television, and commercial jingles for advertisers. It has made more radio jingles than any other jingle company and has become part of American pop culture.

History

The company was founded in 1974 by husband and wife Jonathan M. and Mary Lyn Wolfert. Prior to the formation of JAM, Jon worked for PAMS which he now owns and was a fan of their work. Jon also worked briefly at TM Productions (now TM Studios) and did freelance work for several other studios.

JAM is the only production house of its type which has been continuously owned and operated by its founders for over 40 years. It produces jingles for clients ranging from local DJs to the most influential radio stations in the world.

WPEN and WMGK Philadelphia were among the company's earliest major-market clients. Within a few years, JAM jingles were used by many of the most listened-to radio stations of all time including WABC, WPLJ, and WHTZ in New York, WLS AM and WLS-FM in Chicago, KIIS AM & FM in Los Angeles, Jovem Pan, Jovem Pan FM, Transamérica FM, Metropolitana FM, Rádio Globo and Manchete FM in Brazil and BBC Radio 1 and Radio 2 in London, UK. JAM also created themes and jingles for many syndicated radio programs, including those hosted by Casey Kasem, Dick Clark, Rick Dees, Dick Bartley, Bob Costas, Scott Shannon, Dan Ingram and others. In addition, JAM has worked for various TV clients including ABC, NBC (David Letterman), VH-1, GMA Network (Philippines), and more.

Popularity

In the UK, almost all jingles heard on BBC Radio 1 and 2 between the mid-1970s and mid-1990s were made by JAM.

In the United States, JAM has produced more custom jingles for KOST in Los Angeles than any other station, although WLS in Chicago is very close. JAM's top-selling package has been "Warp Factor," created for Z100 in 1985. Since 2001, both XM Satellite Radio and Sirius Satellite Radio (now Sirius-XM) make extensive use of JAM jingles on their music channels.

In Brazil, JAM produced jingles for many stations, such as Jovem Pan, Transamérica FM, Metropolitana FM, Manchete FM and Atlântida. The majority of these stations used "resings" from packages like: Double Plus, Meltdown, Music Jam and One FM.

In Indonesia, JAM has produced jingles for many stations in Jakarta, Bandung and Surabaya among others.

In the Philippines, JAM has produced jingles for many stations in Manila (specifically 89 DMZ, Campus Radio WLS-FM, Zoo FM 101.9, and 102.7 Star FM), Cebu, Davao and Zamboanga among others.

JAM jingles have also been used in movies and TV shows to add authenticity to the era or location of a scene.

The JAM building, which houses two recording studios, offices, and a large media archive, is located in Dallas, just east of the downtown area.

References

External links
jingles.com - JAM official website

Mass media companies established in 1974
Companies based in Dallas
Jingle companies
Mass media companies of the United States
Radio production companies
1974 establishments in Texas